The Sunset-Camellia Open Invitational was a PGA Tour event that was played at Sunset Oaks Country Club in Rocklin, California in October 1964. It was played for only a single year, although at the time it was hoped that it would become a regular stop on the Tour. Big name professional golfers like Arnold Palmer, Gary Player and Jack Nicklaus elected not to play, and despite intensive local media coverage, galleries were small.

The tournament was won by Californian Bob McCallister, his second victory in a PGA event. The failure of the tournament and the demise of Sunset City, a real estate project associated with the country club, led to a series of name changes and changes in ownership.

Winners

References

Former PGA Tour events
Golf in California